Hebbar is a Hindu surname from Karnataka in India. It is found amongst various Brahmin communities, including Chitpavan Brahmins, Deshastha Brahmins, Havyaka Brahmins, Kota Brahmins, Panchagrama Brahmins, Shivalli Brahmins, Tuluva Hebbars, Sthanika Brahminss, Smartha Brahmins and Hebbar Iyengars.

Etymology

Hebbar was derived from the Kannada word, hebbu/hiridhu meaning big, and haruva which means a Brahman.

Notable people

The following is a list of notable people with last name Hebbar.

 Ashwin Hebbar (born 1995), Indian cricket player
 Kattingeri Krishna Hebbar (1911–1996), Indian artist 
 
 Nistula Hebbar (born 1975), Indian journalist
 Rajesh Hebbar (born 1967), Indian actor
 Ranjani Hebbar (1983–2013), Indian musician

References

See also 
 Malik Hebbar (born 1973), French football player

Indian surnames
Karnataka society